Stolen Moments is an album by American guitarist Lee Ritenour released in 1990, recorded for the GRP label. The album reached #3 on Billboard's Jazz chart.

Track listing
"Uptown" (Lee Ritenour) - 6:40
"Stolen Moments" (Oliver Nelson) - 6:36
"24th Street Blues" (Lee Ritenour) - 5:23
"Haunted Heart" (Arthur Schwartz, Howard Dietz) - 4:53
"Waltz for Carmen" (Lee Ritenour, Mitch Holder) - 6:23
"St. Bart's" (Lee Ritenour) - 4:06
"Blue in Green" (Miles Davis) - 8:00
"Sometime Ago" (Sergio Mihanovich) - 4:05

Personnel
Lee Ritenour – Gibson L5 electric guitar
Alan Broadbent – acoustic piano (Roland Fender Rhodes on "St. Bart's")
Ernie Watts – tenor saxophone (except on "Haunted Heart")
Harvey Mason – drums
John Pattitucci – acoustic bass
Mitch Holder – acoustic guitar on "Waltz for Carmen" and "St. Bart's"

Charts

References

External links
Lee Ritenour - Stolen Moments at Discogs
Lee Ritenour's Official Site

1990 albums
GRP Records albums
Lee Ritenour albums